Stapfer is a surname. Notable people with the surname include:

Paul Stapfer (1840–1917), French writer
Philipp Albert Stapfer (1766–1840), Swiss politician, diplomat, and philosopher who settled in France

See also
Stapper